Aqsa, Aksa, al-Aksa or al-Aqsa usually refer to either:

, also known as the Qibli Mosque, a congregational mosque in the al-Aqsa Mosque compound

Al-Aqsa may also refer to:

Organizations named for the compound
 al-Aqsa Foundation, international charity with alleged ties to the Palestinian militant organisation Hamas
 al-Aqsa Martyrs' Brigades, coalition of Palestinian nationalist militias in the West Bank
 al-Aqsa TV, the official Hamas-run television channel
 al-Aqsa University, Palestinian university established in 1991 in the Gaza Strip region of the Palestinian territories
 Jund al-Aqsa, a Salafist jihadist organization that was active during the Syrian Civil War

Events named for the compound
 Al-Aqsa Intifada, the second Palestinian Intifada, named because of Ariel Sharon's visit to the Al Aqsa Compound (Temple Mount) in 2000
 Al Aqsa Massacre, a 1990 massacre which took place at the Al Aqsa Compound (Temple Mount)

Quran
, lit. 'The Furthest Mosque', a place mentioned in the 17th chapter of the Quran for which the Jerusalem site is named, and from where the prophet Muhammad is believed to have undertaken his night journey known as Isra' and Mi'raj

Businesses
 Aksa (company), Turkish company manufacturing carbon fiber, natural white and solution dyed acrylic staple fiber, tow and tops for yarn spinning and non wovens 
 Aksa Power Generation, Turkish company which manufactures electric generators

People
 Aqsa Parvez (1991–2007), the victim of an honour killing in Mississauga, Ontario, Canada
Aqsa, American rapper and one half of iLoveFriday, best known for "Mia Khalifa"

Places 
 Aqsa Mosque, Rabwah, a mosque in Rabwah, Pakistan 
 Aqsa Mosque, Qadian, a mosque in Qadian, India
  ("The Farthest West"), the ancient name of Morocco

Other
 Tuvan akşa, the currency of the Tuvan People's Republic (Tannu-Tuva) between 1934 and 1944

See also 
 Axa (disambiguation)